Mynydd Cambergi or Mynydd Cam-bergi is a mountain in southern Snowdonia, Wales. It is a summit on a long ridge between Mynydd y Waun to the north and Foel Grochan to the east.

Near the summit of the mountain lies the open pit of Cambergi quarry, which was worked from the 1870s to the 1890s.

References

Mountains and hills of Snowdonia
Landmarks in Wales
Mountains and hills of Gwynedd
Aberllefenni